The men's 4 × 100 metre medley relay at the 2007 World Aquatics Championships took place on 1 April 2007 at the Rod Laver Arena in Melbourne, Australia. The top-12 finishers from this race qualified for the event at the 2008 Olympics.

The existing records when the event started were:
World record (WR):  3:30.68, USA (Peirsol, Hansen, Crocker, Lezak), 21 August 2004 in Athens, Greece.
Championship record (CR): 3:31.54, (USA) (Peirsol, Hansen, Crocker, Lezak), Barcelona 2003 (27 July 2003)

Results

Finals

Heats

See also
Swimming at the 2005 World Aquatics Championships – Men's 4 × 100 metre medley relay
Swimming at the 2008 Summer Olympics – Men's 4 × 100 metre medley relay
Swimming at the 2009 World Aquatics Championships – Men's 4 × 100 metre medley relay

References

Men's 4x100m Medley Relay Heats results from the 2007 World Championships. Published by OmegaTiming.com (official timer of the '07 Worlds); retrieved 2009-06-30.
Men's 4x100m Medley Relay Final results from the 2007 World Championships. Published by OmegaTiming.com (official timer of the '07 Worlds); retrieved 2009-06-30.

Swimming at the 2007 World Aquatics Championships